Gosforth is a rural suburb of the Maitland City Council.

Geography 
The suburb of Gosforth is situated to the west of the Maitland township in the vicinity of Anambah, Aberglasslyn and Rutherford. Gosforth is a small town that houses livestock and farming land and is surrounded by the Hunter River and close to many shopping precincts.

Suburbs of Maitland, New South Wales